Syeda Marvi Faseeh is a Pakistani politician who has been a member of the Provincial Assembly of Sindh since August 2018.

Political career

She was elected to the Provincial Assembly of Sindh as a candidate of Pakistan Peoples Party (PPP) on a reserved seat for women in 2018 Pakistani general election.

References

Living people
Women members of the Provincial Assembly of Sindh
Pakistan People's Party MPAs (Sindh)
Year of birth missing (living people)